George McMahon may refer to:
George McMahon (actor) (born 1985), Irish actor
George McMahon (failed assassin) (died 1970), journalist and attempted assassin
George McMahon (activist) (born 1950), patient in the Compassionate Investigational New Drug program
George McMahon (politician) (1929–2019), Canadian politician in Prince Edward Island